John Byrne Leicester Warren, 3rd Baron de Tabley (26 April 1835 – 22 November 1895) was an English poet, numismatist, botanist and an authority on bookplates.

Biography

He was eldest son of George Fleming Leicester (afterwards Warren), Lord de Tabley (1811–1887), by his wife (married: 1832) Catherina Barbara (1814–1869), second daughter of Jerome, Count de Salis-Soglio.

The young Warren, as he then was, was educated at Eton from 1847 to 1851, in the Rev. Edward Coleridge's house, and then at Christ Church, Oxford, where he took his degree in 1856 with second class honours in classics, law, and modern history. In the autumn of 1858 he went to Turkey as unpaid attaché to Lord Stratford de Redcliffe. In 1860 he was called to the bar from Lincoln's Inn. He was commissioned as a part-time Lieutenant into the Cheshire Yeomanry and unsuccessfully contested Mid-Cheshire in 1868 as a Liberal.

After his mother died and his father's re-marriage in 1871 Warren removed to London, where he became a close friend of Tennyson. Tennyson once said of him: 'He is Faunus, he is a woodland creature'.

From 1877 until his succession to the barony and estates in 1887, Warren was lost to his friends, assuming the life of a recluse. It was not until 1892, five years after becoming Lord de Tabley, that he returned to London life and enjoyed a renaissance of reputation and friendship.

During the later years of his life, Tabley made many new friends, besides reopening old associations, and he seemed to be gathering around him a small literary company when his health broke, and he died at Ryde on the Isle of Wight in his sixty-first year. He is buried at St Oswald’s Church, Lower Peover in Cheshire.

Although his reputation will live almost exclusively as that of a poet, Tabley was a man of many studious tastes. He was at one time an authority on numismatics (he was a first cousin of the numismatist John, Count de Salis-Soglio), he wrote two novels, published  A Guide to the Study of Book Plates (1880), and the fruit of his careful researches in botany was printed posthumously in his elaborate Flora of Cheshire (1899).

Poetry, however, was his first and last passion, and to that he devoted the best energies of his life. Lord de Tabley's first impulse towards poetry came from his friend George Fortescue, with whom he shared a close companionship during his Oxford days, and whom he lost, as Tennyson lost Hallam, within a few years of their taking their degrees. Fortescue was killed by falling from the mast of Lord Drogheda's yacht in November 1859, and this gloomy event plunged Tabley into a deep depression. Between 1859 and 1862 he issued four little volumes of pseudonymous verse (by G. F. Preston), in the production of which he had been greatly stimulated by the sympathy of Fortescue. Once more he assumed a pseudonym: his Praeterita (1863) bearing the name of William Lancaster.

In the next year he published Eclogues and Monodramas, followed in 1865 by Studies in Verse. These volumes all displayed technical grace and much natural beauty; but it was not till the publication of Philoctetes in 1866 that Tabley met with any wide recognition. Philoctetes bore the initials M.A., which, to the author's dismay, were interpreted as meaning Matthew Arnold. He at once disclosed his identity, and received the congratulations of his friends, among whom were Tennyson, Browning and Gladstone.

In 1867 he published Orestes, in 1870 Rehearsals and in 1873 Searching the Net. These last two bore his own name, John Leicester Warren. He was somewhat disappointed by their lukewarm reception, and when in 1876 The Soldier of Fortune, a drama on which he had bestowed much careful labor, proved a complete failure, he retired altogether from the literary arena.

It was not until 1893, that he was persuaded to return, and the immediate success in that year of his Poems, Dramatic and Lyrical, encouraged him to publish a second series in 1895, the year of his death. The genuine interest with which these volumes were welcomed did much to lighten the last years of a somewhat sombre and solitary life. His posthumous poems were collected in 1902.

The characteristics of Tabley's poetry are pre-eminently magnificence of style, derived from a close study of Milton, sonority, dignity, weight, and colour. His passion for detail was both a strength and a weakness: it lent a loving fidelity to his description of natural objects, but it sometimes involved him in a loss of simple effect from over-elaboration of treatment. He was always a student of the classic poets, and drew much of his inspiration directly from them.  His ambition was always for the heights, a region naturally ice-bound at periods, but always a country of clear atmosphere and bright, vivid outlines.

See an excellent sketch by Edmund Gosse in his Critical Kit-Kats (1896).
An extract of what Gosse wrote:
'His character was like an opal, where all the colours lie purdue, drowned in a milky mystery, and so arranged that to a couple of observers, simultaneously bending over it, the prevalent hue shall in one case seem a pale green, in the other a fiery crimson'.

A poem
A Pastoral

Venetian School
Arcadian spaces of great grass arise;
Crisp lambs are merry : hoary vales are laid,
Studded with roe-deer and wild strawberries;
In one a shepherd tabours near a maid;

Who teases at the button of his cloak,
Where rarely underneath them grows the herb;
A squirrel eyes ther lovers from an oak,
And speckled horses pasture without curb.

In a fair meadow set with tulip-heads.
A water-mill rolls little crested falls
Of olive torrent, broken in grey threads.
A grave-yard crowds black crosses in square walls.

And up behind in a still orchard close
The apples ripen, crushing down the trees,
In millions, russet-green and amber-rose,
Fit for the gardens of the Hesperides.

Such colour as the morning brings the skies,
Such mirage as our dreams in childhood gave,
Infinite cadence of ethereal dyes,
The radiance of a rainbow-burnished wave.

Quaint pastoral Arcadia, where are set
Thy rainy lands and reddish underwoods?
Earth has not held thy fabled sunsets yet,
Though lovers build their palace on thy roods.

Sisters

Catherine (1838–1881). Buried Harlington, Middlesex.
Meriel (1839–72), married (1862), Allen, 6th Earl Bathurst (1832–1892), of Cirencester. (He succeeded in 1878, after her death).
Eleanor (1841-14 August 1914), married (1864), Sir Baldwyn Leighton, MP, 8th Baronet (1836-2 January 1897), of Loton, Salop.
She was (eventual) heir to her brother in 1895, and in 1900 took the name Leighton-Warren.
Margaret (1847–1921), married (1875), Sir Arthur Cowell-Stepney, 2nd Bt, (aka Emile Algernon Arthur Keppel Cowell-Stepney) (1834–1909), of Llanelli.
Their daughter Catherine Muriel [sic] Cowell Stepney (Miss Alcyone Stepney) (1876-1952), was painted by Sir John Everett Millais, Royal Academy, 1880, no. 239. Of Cilymaenllwyd, Llanelli, she married Sir Stafford Howard, KCB, DL, JP, MP in 1911.

and two other children, who both died in infancy.

Two of de Tabley's sisters, a niece and an uncle

References

Country Life, "Tabley Hall, The seat of Mr. C. Leicester Warren", by Christopher Hussey, 21 July 1923, (vol. 54, page 84).

Further reading
 Gosse, Edmund (1913). "Lord De Tabley." In: Critical Kit-kats. London: William Heinemann, pp. 165–195.

External links

 Tabley House, official web-site. See Tabley House (an internal link).
 Collected poems 
 Tabley Collection at the John Rylands Library, University of Manchester.

1835 births
1895 deaths
People educated at Eton College
Alumni of Christ Church, Oxford
Barons in the Peerage of the United Kingdom
Cheshire Yeomanry officers
English male poets
19th-century English poets
19th-century English male writers
Eldest sons of British hereditary barons
Literary peers